is a 1992 Japanese animated adventure-fantasy film written and directed by Hayao Miyazaki. It is based on Hikōtei Jidai ("The Age of the Flying Boat"), a three-part 1989 watercolor manga by Miyazaki. It stars the voices of Shūichirō Moriyama, Tokiko Kato, Akemi Okamura and Akio Ōtsuka. Animated by Studio Ghibli for Tokuma Shoten, Japan Airlines and the Nippon Television Network, it was produced by Toshio Suzuki and distributed by Toho. Its score is by Japanese composer Joe Hisaishi.

The plot revolves around an Italian World War I ex-fighter ace, now living as a freelance bounty hunter chasing "air pirates" in the Adriatic Sea. However, an unusual curse has transformed him into an anthropomorphic pig. Once called Marco Pagot (Marco Rossolini in the American version), he is now known to the world as "Porco Rosso", Italian for "Red Pig".

A first English-dubbed version was made for Japan Airlines and included in the Ghibli LD Box Set and on the first Region 2 DVD releases in 2002. The film was later redubbed by Walt Disney Home Entertainment and released on DVD and Blu-ray in the United States and Canada on February 22, 2005. GKIDS re-issued the film on Blu-ray and DVD on November 21, 2017, under a new deal with Studio Ghibli.

Plot

In 1929, Porco Rosso, an Italian World War I fighter ace and freelance bounty hunter who has been cursed to have a pig's head, fends off an attack on an ocean liner by airborne pirates. Porco treats himself to dinner at the Hotel Adriano, which is run by his friend Gina.

At the hotel, the heads of the pirate gangs are contracting Curtis, an arrogant and ambitious American ace, to assist them in their next attacks. Curtis falls in love with Gina on the spot but is frustrated to see his declarations rebuffed and her affection for Porco. After successfully executing a pirating mission, Curtis tracks down Porco, who is flying to Milan to have his plane serviced, and shoots him down as he experiences an engine outage, claiming to have killed him. Porco survives, though his plane is heavily damaged. Porco continues the trip by train with the remains of the plane, much to the irritation of Gina, who reminds him that there is a warrant for his arrest in Italy.

Porco arrives discreetly in Milan to meet Piccolo, his mechanic. He learns that Piccolo's sons have emigrated to find work elsewhere due to the Great Depression, and much of the engineering will have to be carried on by his young granddaughter Fio. In addition to this, the plane is rebuilt exclusively by Piccolo's female relatives, with even old grandmothers helping, in order to earn money. Porco is initially skeptical of Fio's abilities as a mechanic, but after seeing her dedication to the repair project he accepts her as a competent engineer. Once Porco's plane is finished, Fio joins him on his flight home, with the justification that if the secret police arrest the team, they can say that Porco forced them to help and took Fio as a hostage. Stopping off to refuel on the way, Porco discovers that the new fascist government is beginning to hire seaplane pirates for their own use, thus putting him out of business.

Back at the Hotel Adriano, Curtis proposes to Gina but she turns him down, saying that she is waiting for Porco Rosso. Upon returning home, Porco and Fio are ambushed by the pirates, who threaten to kill Porco and destroy his plane. Fio talks them out of it, but Curtis appears and challenges Porco to a final duel. Fio makes a deal with him declaring that if Porco wins, Curtis must pay off his debts owed to Piccolo's company, and if Curtis wins, he may marry her.

That night, while Porco is preparing shells for the dogfight, Fio briefly sees his true face instead of the pig. He tells Fio a story from World War I. Two days after Gina's first wedding to his friend Bellini, his squadron was attacked by Austro-Hungarian aircraft. Overwhelmed and unable to save his fellow pilots he entered a cloud to evade his pursuers. He recalls blacking out and awakening to find himself in complete stillness above the clouds, with a silver band shimmering high in the distant sky. Allied and enemy aircraft, flown by the airmen who died in the dogfight—Bellini included—rise out of the cloud and fly upward towards the band, ignoring him. Porco soon sees that the band is in fact thousands of planes flying together. After offering in vain to die in Bellini's place for Gina's sake, he blacks out again and awakens flying low over the sea, alone. He concludes that, as a pilot whose life is always in jeopardy, he is meant to "fly solo". Fio rebukes him and kisses him on the cheek.

The next day, the duel is arranged and a large crowd gathers to observe. The indecisive and long dogfight between Porco and Curtis soon devolves into a bare-knuckle boxing match when both planes' machine guns jam. As they fight, Porco accuses Curtis of being a womanizer, but Curtis responds that he is worse; Fio adores him, and Gina is waiting on him to the exclusion of any other man, but he fails to reciprocate either of them, especially Gina. This comes as such a shock to Porco that Curtis is able to knock him down, only for Porco to be saved by a pirate referee signaling the end of a round. The fight ends with both combatants knocking each other out and falling under the shallow water.
Gina arrives and calls out to 'Marco' (Porco), who rises first and is declared the winner. She warns the crowd that the Italian air force has been alerted and is on its way, and invites everyone to regroup at her hotel. To Gina's frustration, Porco hands Fio over to Gina, requesting that she look after her, and turns away. Just before Gina's plane takes off, Fio leans out and gives Porco a kiss.

As the crowd leaves, Porco volunteers to lead the air force away and invites Curtis to join him. Curtis reacts with surprise and asks Porco to turn around, suggesting that—like Fio—he had briefly seen Marco's true face. In the epilogue, Fio narrates as she flies in a jet seaplane that in the end Porco outflies the Italian air force and remains at large; Fio herself became president of the Piccolo company, which is now an aircraft manufacturer; Curtis became a famous actor, and the pirates continued to attend the Hotel Adriano in their old age. She does not divulge whether Gina's hope about Porco Rosso was ever realized, saying it is their secret. However, a red plane can be seen docked by Gina's garden as the jet flies over the hotel.

After the credits, a familiar red seaplane soars in the sky before disappearing into the clouds.

Cast

Production

The film was originally planned as a short in-flight film for Japan Airlines based on Hayao Miyazaki's manga The Age of the Flying Boat, but grew into a feature-length film. The outbreak of war in Yugoslavia cast a shadow over production and prompted a more serious tone for the film, which had been set in Dalmatia. The airline remained a major investor in the film, and showed it as an in-flight film well before its theatrical release. Due to this, the opening text introducing the film appears simultaneously in Japanese, Italian, Korean, English, Chinese, Spanish, Arabic, Russian, French, and German. Telecom Animation Film Co., Ltd. helped animate the film.

As with Miyazaki's other films, Joe Hisaishi composed the soundtrack. For the soundtrack, Tokiko Kato performs "The Time of Cherries" as well as an original song, "Once in a While, Talk of the Old Days".

History, geography and politics

Porco Rosso is one of the few films directed by Hayao Miyazaki in which the historical and geographical settings are clearly defined and where most of the story could have happened in the real world. Marco is an Italian hero from the First World War and is shown fighting against Austro-Hungarian fighter planes in a flashback sequence. The story is set in Milan, the Adriatic Sea east coast between Dalmatian and Kvarner islands, and the city of Fiume (now Rijeka) after its annexation to fascist Italy and Northern Italy. The concealed beach Porco uses as a hideout bears a strong resemblance to Stiniva Beach, on the southern side of the Croatian island of Vis.

Miyazaki shed light on the political context of the making of the film in an interview with Empire. He reflects that the conflicts that broke out during the film's production (such as those in Dubrovnik and elsewhere) made Porco Rosso a much more complicated and difficult film.

Evident historical and political realism aside, at least one scholar has argued that the film's more overt historical references can be understood as representative of wakon yōsai (Jp; "Japanese spirit, Western learning")—a tendency, since the Meiji period, for Japanese artists to paint Europe as spectacular, while simultaneously maintaining the distance necessary to preserve a distinct sense of Japanese identity. "In Porco Rosso," states academic Chris Wood, "Europe is tamed, rendered as a charming site of pleasurable consumption, made distant and viewed through a tourist gaze."

Homage to early aviation

The fictional "Piccolo" aircraft company depicted in the film is based on the Italian aircraft manufacturers Caproni and Piaggio. The jet shown in the last scene is very similar in concept to the Caproni C-22J, an aircraft designed by Carlo Ferrarin, a designer for Caproni, whose name is notably used in the film for Marco's Air Force pilot friend. The jet-amphibian also has a V-tail, slightly reminiscent of the Magister jet trainer. The Savoia-Marchetti S.55, Fiat C.R.20 and Macchi M.39 are featured in the movie.

Porco's air-force friend Ferrarin was inspired by the Italian Air Force pilot Arturo Ferrarin who flew with an Ansaldo SVA.9 from Rome to Tokyo in 1920. Additionally, the Caproni Ca.309 light reconnaissance aircraft, known as the "Ghibli", was the namesake for Miyazaki's and Takahata's animation studio.

Porco's plane is named after the Savoia S.21, but is based on the Macchi M.33. While in Piccolo's engine shop, the engine to be used in Porco's rebuilt Savoia S.21 also has the word "Ghibli" visible on its rocker covers—in design it is a narrow-angle V-12 engine, similar in form to racing engines of the period. Piccolo mentions that it was used in a racing aeroplane for the Schneider Trophy race in the year before.

In the early 1930s, Italian seaplane designers set world speed records (such as the Macchi M.C.72 designed by the Italian airplane designer Mario Castoldi). One of the test pilots killed during the attempt to set the speed record was named Bellini, the name given to Porco's pilot friend in the film. Italian top fighter aces Francesco Baracca and Adriano Visconti also appear in the film.

Marco Pagot, the real name of the main character, is also a homage to the Pagot brothers, pioneers of Italian animation (Nino and Toni Pagot were the authors of the first Italian animated feature film, The Dynamite Brothers, and Nino's son and daughter Marco and Gi Pagot were Miyazaki's collaborators in the production of Sherlock Hound).

Meanwhile, the character of Curtis is likely to have been named after the American aviation pioneer Glenn Hammond Curtiss who, along with the Wright Brothers, founded the Curtiss-Wright Corporation. Curtis' airplane is a Curtiss R3C, which was built for the 1925 Schneider Cup race (which Porco refers to when he first meets Curtis). His character is also an oblique reference to Ronald Reagan, in that his ambitions lie not only in Hollywood, but also the Presidency. The rest of Curtis' character appears to come directly from the adventure film heroes portrayed by Errol Flynn at this time—indeed, they share a jaw line—including his buccaneering derring-do, willingness to fight, and overall demeanour combined with romantic ardour.

Miyazaki revisited the theme of aviation history in his 2013 film The Wind Rises.

Release
The film was released in Japan on July 18, 1992, by Toho, and was released on VHS by Tokuma Shoten in 1993. The movie was later reissued on VHS by Buena Vista Home Entertainment Japan (now Walt Disney Studios Japan) on April 23, 1999, and was released on DVD on December 18, 2002. The film was released on Blu-ray Disc on November 6, 2013, with a reissue of the DVD following on July 16, 2014.

An English-dubbed version was made for Japan Airlines and was later included in the 1996 Ghibli ga Ippai Laserdisc Box Set and on the 2002 Japanese DVD release of the film. Walt Disney Home Entertainment released the film on DVD on February 22, 2005, and on Blu-ray on February 3, 2015, both with a new English dub featuring the voices of Michael Keaton, Cary Elwes, Susan Egan, and Kimberly Williams-Paisley, which is included on most international releases as well as the 2014 Japanese DVD reissue. This dub was supervised by Tony Bancroft and written by frequent Ghibli dub screenwriters Don and Cindy Hewitt. GKIDS re-issued the film on Blu-ray and DVD on November 21, 2017, under a new deal with Studio Ghibli.

Reception

Box office

In France, it sold 167,793 tickets, equivalent to an estimated  at an average 1992 ticket price of FF34 ($6). In other European countries, it grossed $573,719, for an estimated combined total of  grossed in Japan and Europe.

Critical reception
It won the Cristal du long métrage ("Best feature-length film award") at the 1993 Annecy International Animated Film Festival, and also made Time Outs Top 50 animated movie list. On Rotten Tomatoes, it has a rating of 95% based on 20 reviews. On review aggregator Metacritic, it has a score of 83, indicating "universal acclaim."

Wilson McLachlan, of the Left Field Cinema, considered it "the most underrated film from the Studio Ghibli catalogue." Jeannette Catsoulis of The New York Times wrote: "Mr. Miyazaki smooshes fantasy and history into a pastel-pretty yarn as irresistible as his feminism." Robert Pardi of TV Guide gave the film 4/5 stars, stating: "Miyazaki pays homage to Hollywood’s wartime adventure films in this masterwork built around the adventures of a high-flying pig ... This animated feature's visual splendor is matched by a droll screenplay that takes a sty-side view of heroism ... Seamlessly adapted for American audiences by Donald H. Davis and Cindy Hewitt Davis, this spoof/pastiche of old-movie cliches also soars as a paean to the redeeming power of friendship and loyalty."

Possible sequel
In 2011, Miyazaki said that he wanted to make a follow-up anime to the 1992 original film if his next few films following Ponyo were successful. The film's working name was Porco Rosso: The Last Sortie; it was to have been set during the Spanish Civil War with Porco appearing as a veteran pilot. Miyazaki was to write the film, but Hiromasa Yonebayashi was to direct. The studio has since indicated that the sequel is not in their current plans.

References

External links

 Porco Rosso page at Nausicaa.net
 
 
 
 Porco Rosso at the TCM Movie Database
 
 Review at THEM Anime

1992 films
1992 anime films
1992 comedy films
1990s adventure comedy films
1990s children's animated films
1990s fantasy adventure films
1990s fantasy comedy films
1990s Japanese-language films
Adriatic Sea
Adventure anime and manga
Animated adventure films
Animated films about aviation
Anime comedy films
Anime films based on manga
Annecy Cristal for a Feature Film winners
Fictional aviators
Films about pigs
Films directed by Hayao Miyazaki
Films scored by Joe Hisaishi
Films set in 1929
Films set in Italy
Films set in Milan
Great Depression films
Japanese animated fantasy films
Japanese aviation films
Japanese fantasy adventure films
Japanese fantasy comedy films
Pirates in anime and manga
Air pirates
Studio Ghibli animated films
Toho animated films
World War I films